Mabel Virginia Anna Bent (née Hall-Dare, a.k.a. Mrs J. Theodore Bent) (28 January 1847 – 3 July 1929), was an Anglo-Irish explorer, excavator, writer and photographer. With her husband, J. Theodore Bent (1852–1897), she spent two decades (1877–1897) travelling, collecting and researching in remote regions of the Eastern Mediterranean, Asia Minor, Africa, and Arabia.

Early life

Hall-Dare was born on 28 January 1847, second daughter of Robert Westley Hall-Dare (1817–1866) and his wife Frances Anna Catherine (née Lambart) (c. 1819–1862). Her birthplace was her grandfather’s estate, Beauparc, on the River Boyne in County Meath, Ireland. Shortly after her birth the family moved to Temple House, County Sligo, before re-locating in the early 1860s to County Wexford, acquiring the property that was later to become Newtownbarry House, in Newtownbarry (now the village of Bunclody). While a teenager, Hall-Dare suffered several bereavements, losing both her parents and her two brothers. 
 
Hall-Dare and her sisters received education at home with private governesses and tutors.

Married life

Distant cousins (via the Lambarts), and having met in Norway, Hall-Dare married J. Theodore Bent on 2 August 1877 in the church of Staplestown, Co. Carlow, not far from Mabel’s Irish home. There was wealth on both sides, and the Bents set up home first at 43 Great Cumberland Place, near Marble Arch, in London, later moving closer to the Arch at number 13; Mabel remained in that same rented townhouse for 30 years after Theodore’s death in 1897, until her own death in 1929.

Their first journeys took them to Italy at the end of the 1870s, Theodore, who read history at Oxford University, being interested in Garibaldi and Italian unification.

In the winter of 1882/3, the Bents made a short tour of Greece and the Eastern Mediterranean, disembarking, on their way home, at the Cycladic islands of Tinos and Amorgos to witness the Easter celebrations. They returned late in the year to the same region, the Greek Cyclades, their accounts featuring in Theodore's work (1885) The Cyclades, or Life Among the Insular Greeks. It was during this trip that Mabel Bent began what she called her ‘Chronicles’, essentially her travel notes and diaries that her husband was to use on their return to aid him in writing his articles and papers. Her collection of notebooks is now in the archives of the Hellenic and Roman Library, Senate House, London. Several of her letters home from Africa and Arabia are held in the Royal Geographical Society in London.

In the main, Mabel and Theodore Bent chose to spend the winter and spring months of every year travelling, using summers and autumns to write up their findings and prepare for their next campaigns. Their geographical fields of interest can be roughly grouped into three primary areas: Greece and the Eastern Mediterranean (the 1880s); Africa (the early 1890s); and Southern Arabia (the mid 1890s). Many of the finds and acquisitions the couple collected on their travels are in the British Museum and the Pitt Rivers Museum, Oxford. Some examples of Greek island costumes Mabel Bent brought home from Greece are now in the Victoria and Albert Museum in London and the Benaki Museum, Athens.

Many of Bent’s acquisitions from overseas remained with her until her final years. In 1926 she presented a large amount to the British Museum. She was also in the habit of opening her home for charitable events to display her collection – described as ‘more interesting than many museums’.   
    
For their trip to what are now referred to as the Greek Dodecanese islands (then Turkish) in 1885, Bent travelled with her photographic equipment and, from then on, became expedition photographer. Few of her original photographs have survived, but many were used to produce the illustrations that feature in her husband’s books and articles, and the lantern slides that enhanced his lectures at the Royal Geographical Society in London and elsewhere.

On the Cycladic island of Antiparos in early 1884, the Bents were shown some prehistoric graves by local mining engineers, Robert and John Swan.  Theodore Bent undertook amateur archaeological investigations at two sites on the island and returned to London with skeletal remnants which are now in the Natural History Museum, and many ceramic, stone and obsidian finds that now form a significant part of the British Museum’s Cycladic collection; within a few months he had published the material and his career as an archaeologist/ethnographer, and in which his wife was to be central, was launched.

In the village of Komiaki on Naxos in January 1884, Mabel Bent was introduced to Matthew Simos, a native of Anafi, who became the Bents' dragoman for the majority of their future expeditions.

Bent's journeys with her husband 1880s–1890s

 1883: Areas of Turkey and Greece
 1884: The Greek Cyclades
 1885: The Greek Dodecanese
 1886–1888: The northern Aegean, and far down along the Turkish coast
 1889: Bahrain, to excavate the Dilmun Burial Mounds, via India and, south-north, the length of Iran on horseback
 1890: Along the Turkish coast and into Armenia
 1891: Mashonaland (modern Zimbabwe) on behalf of Cecil Rhodes to explore the site of Great Zimbabwe
 1893: Ethiopia (Aksum)
 1894: Yemen (Wadi Hadramaut)
 1895: Muscat, Oman and Dhofar, during which they identify the remains at Khor Rori
 1896: Sudan and the west coast of the Red Sea
 1897: Socotra and Yemen

The extended journeys made by the Bents in remote places called for them to carry with them adequate medical supplies. Mabel Bent tried to alleviate where possible ailments presented by the people they travelled among, for example in the Wadi Khonab (Hadramaut, Yemen) in January 1894, as recorded in her diary: ‘Among the patients was brought a baby… such an awful object of thinness and sores… No cure had we, and though we did consult over ¼ drop of chlorodine, in much water, we felt it was really dangerous to meddle with the poor thing… Theodore told them it could not live long and it died that evening or next day.’

Widowhood and later life

Theodore Bent died in May 1897  of malarial complications after a hurried return to London from Aden, where the couple were both hospitalized at the end of their last journey together.

The year after her husband's death, Bent made a solo visit to Egypt to see the sites on the Nile. She attempted a last diary, which she headed 'A lonely useless journey'. It is the last of her travel notebooks in the archives of the Hellenic and Roman Library, Senate House, London.

Until 1914, Mabel Bent was a regular visitor to the Holy Land. In Jerusalem, Bent joined the ‘Garden Tomb Association’, whose members were dedicated to preserving a tomb-site just outside the Damascus Gate, which they believed to be Christ’s tomb. Bent was made London secretary and later co-edited an update of the guidebook, with Charlotte Hussey, a fellow Irishwoman, who was the official custodian of the tomb in Jerusalem. Bent and Hussey fell out with the local consular official, John Dickson, which resulted ultimately in questions to the House of Commons and an enquiry. Documents in Bent’s Foreign Office files contain comments such as: ‘A most tiresome and persistent woman’; ‘Could not the F.O. cause these women to be ejected from the place?’; ‘It would be an excellent thing if Mrs. Bent could be prosecuted for libel’; ‘She is a very vindictive and obnoxious person, and has given the unfortunate Consul for a long time past a great deal of trouble by her vicious proceedings’. Further incidents included a solitary and potentially dangerous outing to the salt deserts around Jebel Usdum, south of Jerusalem, where her horse rolled on her, breaking her leg. Her sister Ethel was required to travel from Ireland to nurse her.

The Bethel Seal

Some writers think that Bent may have been involved in an archaeological puzzle known as the ‘Bethel Seal’ controversy. Some 15 km north of Jerusalem, in the village of Bethel (modern Beytin/Baytin/Beitin), a small clay stamp/seal was found in 1957 that looked identical to one obtained by Theodore Bent on their trip into the Wadi Hadramaut (Yemen) in 1894. There have been suggestions that Bent had deposited the artefact in archaeological remains in Bethel as a token to her husband, to bolster his theories about early trade links in the wider region, at a time when Theodore Bent's findings were being criticized and his academic reputation questioned, especially his interpretation of the Great Zimbabwe monuments.

Recognition

Bent was suggested as a possible inclusion among the first women Fellows of the Royal Geographical Society. The suggestion began from an article in the Observer (April 1893), on the eve of the debate as to whether more women Fellows should be appointed in the future, after the first group the previous year. This article concludes: ‘... the battle of the ladies promises to become historic in the annals of the Society… On the original question of the eligibility of women as Fellows of the Society it is scarcely possible that there can be two opinions. Mrs. Bishop (Miss Isabella Bird) and Miss Gordon Cumming are ladies who are surely as much entitled to membership of the Royal Geographical Society as are the great majority of the gentlemen who write F.R.G.S. after their names, and Mrs. Theodore Bent, Mrs. St. George Littledale, Mrs. Archibald Little, and a host of others might be named who have shared their husbands’ travels in little known lands, and may fairly claim such privileges as Fellowship of the Royal Geographical Society confers.’ However, by the end of July 1893, the then RGS president, Sir Mountstuart Elphinstone Grant Duff, had resigned over the failed vote to continue admitting women Fellows and no more women were admitted.

Publications

Bent published four books. Southern Arabia (1900) is a travel book she prepared from her notebooks and those of her husband covering all their journeys in the region. In 1903 she published a small anthology of card games for travellers, A patience pocket book: plainly printed. Based on her interests in British Israelism, Anglo-Saxons from Palestine; or, The imperial mystery of the lost tribes appeared in 1908. Her final publication was a revised edition of a guide to the Garden Tomb in Jerusalem, The Garden Tomb, Golgotha and the Garden of Resurrection (c. 1920).

All of Bent’s original diaries held in the archive of the Hellenic Society, London, except for those covering the couple’s trip to Ethiopia in 1893, have now been digitized and are available on open access.

Death

Mabel Bent died in her London home on 3 July 1929, her death certificate citing ‘myocardial failure’ and ‘rheumatoid arthritis (chronic)’.

She is buried with her husband in the Hall-Dare family plot, St Mary’s Church, Theydon Bois, Essex.

References 

1847 births
1929 deaths
English travel writers
British women travel writers
19th-century English non-fiction writers
Female explorers
British women photographers
Explorers of Arabia
South African explorers